The Chief of Defence Staff is the professional head of the Jamaica Defence Force. They are  responsible for the administration and the operational control of the Jamaican military. It is the highest ranked military position in the country.

JDF Chiefs

Chiefs of Staff (1962–2007)

In December 2007 the title of Chief of Staff was replaced by Chief of Defence Staff and filled by an incumbent.

Chiefs of Defence Staff (2008–present)

References

Military of Jamaica
Jamaica